Ambolodia Sud or Ambolodia Atsimo is a town and commune in western Madagascar. It belongs to the district of Besalampy, which is a part of Melaky Region. The population of the commune was estimated to be approximately 2,000 in 2001 commune census.

Only primary schooling is available. The majority 90% of the population of the commune are farmers, while an additional 10% receives their livelihood from raising livestock. The most important crop is raffia palm, while other important products are cassava and rice.

References and notes 

Populated places in Melaky